Tisis isoplasta is a moth in the family Lecithoceridae. It was described by Edward Meyrick in 1929. It is found on Java in Indonesia.

The wingspan is about 22 mm. The forewings are orange yellow and the costa narrowly grey towards the base. The hindwings are grey with a streak of pale yellowish suffusion beneath the costa from the base to the end of the cell.

References

Moths described in 1929
Tisis